Ronald J. Brownstein (born April 6, 1958) is an American journalist, political correspondent, and analyst.

Early life and education
Brownstein was born to a Jewish family on April 6, 1958 in New York City, the son of Shirley and David Brownstein. His father was an electrician. In 1979, he graduated with a B.A. in English Literature from the State University of New York - Binghamton. He then worked as senior staff writer for Ralph Nader.

Career
In 1983, he went to work for the National Journal as White House correspondent. In 1987, he became a contributing editor for the Los Angeles Times. In 1989, he left the National Journal to work full-time as national correspondent for the Los Angeles Times. In 1993, he was named their national political correspondent. In 1997, he accepted a position as chief political correspondent for U.S. News & World Report. In 1998, he went to work for CNN as a political analyst where he remained until 2004. He is currently senior political analyst for CNN and Editorial Director for Strategic Partnerships for Atlantic Media.

Personal life
Brownstein has been married twice. His first wife was Nina Easton; they had two children before divorcing. In 2005, he married Eileen Nicole McMenamin, the former communications director for Senator John McCain, in a nondenominational ceremony in Henderson, Nevada.

References

External links

1958 births
Jewish American journalists
CNN people
Binghamton University alumni
Living people
21st-century American Jews